The Suspended Looping Coaster (or SLC, as referred to by coaster enthusiasts) is a model of steel inverted roller coaster built by Vekoma. There are at least 39 different installations across the world. Vekoma is now marketing a Suspended Thrill Coaster as a successor to the Suspended Looping Coaster. The Odyssey is the largest, fastest and tallest SLC ever built at Fantasy Island in the UK.

History
The first Suspended Looping Coaster installation was El Condor at Walibi Holland in the Netherlands. It was initially designed to run with ten cars in each train. Trouble with this configuration led to the trains being shortened to eight cars to a train. T3 at Kentucky Kingdom was the second prototype model Suspended Looping Coaster and the first in the United States. Like El Condor, it was designed to run with ten cars in a train, though T3's trains were shortened to seven cars for similar reasons.

The roller coaster is considered to still be in production. The latest new installation (i.e. not relocated) was Queen Cobra at Sun World Danang Wonders in Đà Nẵng, Vietnam which opened in 2017

Ride

Layouts
There are several different layouts of Suspended Looping Coasters although most feature a similar pattern. The ride starts by taking riders up a  chain lift hill. Once at the top, the train drops down a steep, banked right turn where it enters the first inversion element - a right rollover. A rollover is an Immelmann loop followed by a Dive Loop After exiting this element, the train traverses a tall, banked left turn and approaches the ride's next inversion - a left sidewinder. A sidewinder is similar to an Immelmann loop; however, it features a half-loop followed by a half-corkscrew (rather than an inline twist). After exiting the sidewinder, the train navigates a 270o right upwards helix before entering the ride's final two inversions - a double inline twist. A banked 90o turn to the right then turns the train back around to face towards the station. At this point, some models feature an additional helix to the left, while others simply continue straight into the brake run. The standard model also has a relatively compact layout, providing numerous "footchoppers".

Vekoma have also manufactured three custom Suspended Looping Coasters: The Great Nor'easter at Morey's Piers (which is nearly identical to standard SLC, but with a custom station and supports), Kumali at Flamingo Land, and Jubilee Odyssey at Fantasy Island.

Trains

Many Suspended Looping Coasters operate with two trains consisting of ten cars, though some operate with as few as seven cars. Poor maintenance, poor track layout or most likely non-exact track manufacturing can cause SLCs riders to experience notoriously painful "head banging", whereby the head hits the Over the Shoulder Restraints. They also use very small plastic seats with little or no room for a person to move. Contrary to popular belief, the wheel spacing on the trains (the 'gaps' between the side friction wheels, up-stop wheels, and the track) adds little to the roughness of these rides. Vekoma is currently manufacturing new trains with convenient hip harnesses. Unlike the first generation of trains, this modification will make the overall ride experience more comfortable. Vekoma also makes vest-like harnesses that allow to rider to sit more comfortably while riding. The only four known places to have these trains are Morey's Piers, Isla Magica in Spain, Six Flags New England in Agawam, MA and Beto Carrero World in Santa Catarina, Brazil. In 2012, Lethal Weapon - The Ride at Warner Bros. Movie World reopened as Arkham Asylum - Shock Therapy. The newly opened ride runs with trains manufactured by Kumbak and uses less restrictive harnesses which are similar, but not identical to, the vest-like restraints found on the SLCs at Morey's Piers and Isla Magica.

The Suspended Looping Coaster is similar in design to other inverted roller coasters, however unlike the four-across seating found on Bolliger & Mabillard (B&M) inverted roller coasters, Vekoma SLC's use two-across seating.

Installations
There are at least 42 different installations across the world which have been located at 48 different theme parks.

Similar roller coasters
In China, several alternate versions of this ride have been built. One of them is Shenzhou Coaster, an inverted roller coaster at Beijing Shijingshan Amusement Park in Beijing, China. The train and track are similar to the Suspended Looping Coaster design by Vekoma, but the ride was instead designed and manufactured by Beijing Shibaolai Amusement Equipment. There have been several problems with other models with the same layout, most notably bad pacing in parts of the ride. For example, the "Hanging Roller Coaster" at Crab Island stalled before its sidewinder element, stranding 12 people for over 3 hours. Other SLC's in China are sometimes manufactured by Hebei Zhongye Metallurgical Equipment Manufacturing Co. Ltd., which are known for being poorer than the Beijing Shibaolai models. HZM has tried to smooth out the transitions but the rides experience has not improved. None of these models can operate during winds in excess of 15 mph.

References

External links
Official website
Listing of all Suspended Looping Coasters on the Roller Coaster Database

Steel roller coasters
Mass-produced roller coasters
Vekoma